Ternstroemia cleistogama is a species of flowering plant in the family Pentaphylacaceae. It is endemic to Ecuador, where it occurs above 2500 meters in elevation in the Andes. It has been collected only twice.

References

cleistogama
Endemic flora of Ecuador
Endangered plants
Taxonomy articles created by Polbot